Alec Hepburn (born 30 March 1993) is an English rugby union player who plays as a loosehead prop for Exeter Chiefs in the Aviva Premiership.

Early life 
Hepburn was born in Perth, Australia. When he was young, his family moved to Hopetoun, a small town on the south coast of Western Australia.

Club career
During the 2013–14 season, Hepburn had a spell with London Welsh in the RFU Championship.

In 2014, Hepburn returned to his native Perth and joined Cottesloe Rugby Club.

In January 2015, Hepburn joined Exeter Chiefs. Hepburn was part of the side that lost to Saracens in the final of the 2015–16 Premiership.
The following season saw Exeter defeat Wasps to win their first Premiership title. Hepburn was ruled out of the final through injury.

International career
Hepburn started for the England U20 side that defeated Wales in the final of the 2013 Junior World Cup.

In June 2016, Hepburn scored a try for England Saxons in a tour game against South Africa A.

In January 2018 Hepburn was named in the England squad for the 2018 Six Nations Championship.

References

External links
Exeter Chiefs Profile
ESPN Profile

1993 births
Living people
English rugby union players
Exeter Chiefs players
London Welsh RFC players
Rugby union props
England international rugby union players